The canton of Granville is an administrative division of the Manche department, northwestern France. Its borders were modified at the French canton reorganisation which came into effect in March 2015. Its seat is in Granville.

Composition

It consists of the following communes:
Donville-les-Bains 
Granville
Saint-Pair-sur-Mer
Yquelon

Councillors

Pictures of the canton

References

Cantons of Manche